AngelPad is an American seed-stage startup incubator, launched in September 2010 by Thomas Korte and Carine Magescas with six other former Google employees as mentors. AngelPad provides mentorship, seed money, and networking at two 10-week courses per year.

AngelPad attracted attention in August 2011 after announcing that each of its startups will have the option to accept $100,000 from two venture capital firms at the start of their class.

The incubator has often been compared to Y Combinator.

AngelPad has consistently been ranked among the top startup accelerators in the United States according to 'The Seed Accelerator Rankings' each year. The rankings are developed by MIT, the University of Richmond and Brown University. They evaluate over 160 US Accelerators every year.

Program
The program consists of ten weeks of mentorship, brainstorming, fundraising, and pragmatic advice, concluding with a "Demo Day" in which companies present their value propositions and ideas to hundreds of investors.

Application Process
The application process consists of a written application, starting on the incubator's website.

Fewer than 15 startups were selected out of a pool of 800 applicants for the Winter 2011 class, for an acceptance rate of 1.9%.

Notable alumni companies
Several AngelPad companies have attracted significant rounds of investment or sold to larger companies after completing the incubator program. Notable portfolio companies include: Buffer, CoverHound,  MoPub, Postmates, Astrid, Drone Deploy, Ribbon, Pipedrive, Rolepoint and Vungle.

See also
 Business incubator
 Seed accelerator
 Y Combinator (company)
 Techstars

References

External links
 Forbes ranking of Accelerators 2012
Forbes Ranking of Best Accelerators 2017

Financial services companies established in 2010
Companies based in San Francisco
Technology companies established in 2010
Venture capital firms of the United States
Startup accelerators
2010 establishments in California